= Mishka Mojabber Mourani =

Lebanese poet

Mishka Mojabber Mourani (Arabic: ميشكا مجبر موراني), née Marie Christine Mojabber (born 1953) is a Lebanese poet.

Mishka Mojabber Mourani was born in Alexandria, the second daughter of a Greek mother and Lebanese-Syrian Christian father. The family moved to Beirut when she was ten. A little later they emigrated to Sydney, Australia, where she completed high school and entered Sydney University. She completed a BA and MA in English Literature at the American University of Beirut. She spent most of the Lebanese Civil War in Beirut, teaching English and working as an educational consultant.

== Work ==
- Lest We Forget 1975-1990, 1991
- 'The Fragrant Garden', in Roseanne Saad Khalaf, ed., Hikayat: Short Stories by Lebanese Women, 2006
- Balconies: A Mediterranean Memoir, 2009
- (with Aida Y. Haddad Alone Together, 2012
